Kaiya Seki (Seki Kaiya; born 24 December 1999) is a Japanese swimmer. He competed in the men's 100 metre freestyle event at the 2018 FINA World Swimming Championships (25 m), in Hangzhou, China. He qualified to represent Japan at the 2020 Summer Olympics.

References

External links
 

1999 births
Living people
Sportspeople from Tokyo
Japanese male freestyle swimmers
Swimmers at the 2020 Summer Olympics
Olympic swimmers of Japan
Competitors at the 2019 Summer Universiade
21st-century Japanese people